Ajumako/Enyan/Essiam District is one of the twenty-two districts in Central Region, Ghana. Originally created as an ordinary district assembly in 1988, which was created from the Breman-Ajumako-Enyan District Council from 1974 to 1978. The district assembly was located in the northeast part of Central Region and had Ajumako as its capital town.

Facts of interests
The University of Education, Winneba has a campus at Ajumako. The natives are Fante except the people of Breman Essiam who trace their lineage to Breman, near Kumasi. The main occupation of the people is farming with emerging markets at Breman Essiam and Ajumako. The current Member of parliament of the district is Cassiel Ato Forson.

List of settlements

Sources
 
 District: Ajumako/Enyan/Essiam District

References

Central Region (Ghana)

Districts of the Central Region (Ghana)